Wolfe City is a city in Hunt County, Texas, United States, located at the intersection of State Highways 34 and 11. The population was 1,412 at the 2010 census, down from 1,566 at the 2000 census.

Geography

Wolfe City is located near the northern border of Hunt County at  (33.367996, –96.070430). State Highway 34 runs through the center of town as Santa Fe Street, leading northeast  to Honey Grove and south  to Greenville, the Hunt County seat. State Highway 11 crosses Highway 34 in the northern part of Wolfe City, and runs northwest  to Whitewright and southeast  to Commerce.

Demographics

As of the 2020 United States census, there were 1,399 people, 451 households, and 286 families residing in the city.

Education 
Wolfe City is served by Wolfe City Independent School District.

Gallery

References

External links
Wolfe City official website

Dallas–Fort Worth metroplex
Cities in Hunt County, Texas
Cities in Texas